The Salsali Private Museum [SPM], in Dubai, United Arab Emirates, is the first private museum in the region for contemporary Middle Eastern and international art. It was founded in November 2011 by Ramin Salsali and is located in the industrial area of Al Quoz on Alserkal Avenue, a complex known in the region for its high concentration of galleries and creative spaces.

Exhibitions at SPM feature artworks from the Salsali's collection and exhibits from across the globe. SPM serves as an independent center for art collectors.

Founder 

Ramin Salsali began collecting art at the age of 21.
Born in Tehran in 1964, he studied economics, strategic management, and marketing with a focus on Industry Design in Germany and England. 

In April 2011, Salsali established the museum in Dubai. SPM opened in November 2011, the first private museum for contemporary art in the region. It exhibits Salsali's collection of over 900 pieces of painting, photography, video art, sculpture, and installation art.

Past exhibitions 
 SHOW OFF! (November 2011)
 LIFE IS TOO SHORT (March 2012)
 THE SEISMIC SANCTUARY by Pantea Rahmani (September 2012)  
 IRAN - RPM (November 2012)
 OLYMPIA by Brian Ferry (December 2012) 
 REZA DERAKSHANI (March 2013)
 CHRISTIAN VOIGT (September 2013) 
 CINEMA (December 2013)
 IMRAN QURESHI (January 2014)  
 AMIR HOSSEIN ZANJANI] (March 2014)  
 HIDDEN CONSCIOUSNESS by Mohammed Ehsai (March 2014)
 THE INVISIBLE LANDSCAPE AND CONCRETE FUTURES by Hazem Harb (March 2015) 
 GERMAN COOL  (November 2015)

Publications 

 "Reza Derakshani - Selected works"
 The Seismics Sanctuary - Pantea Rahmani
 Amir Hossein Zanjani solo exhibition catalogue
 "GERMAN COOL" exhibition catalogue

References

External links 
 

2011 establishments in the United Arab Emirates
Art museums and galleries in the United Arab Emirates
Museums established in 2011
Museums in Dubai
Former private collections
Arab art scene